Joyride is the fifth and final studio album from Boston-based band Transit released on October 21, 2014. It is the first and only album not to feature founding member, guitarist and backing vocalist Tim Landers, who departed the band during the recording process. In November, Transit supported Four Year Strong on their headlining US tour.

Composition
Critics variously called the album alternative rock, pop rock, emo,  indie rock, and pop punk.

Track listing

Personnel
Transit
Joe Boynton - Vocals
Torre Cioffi - Guitar/Vocals
P.J. Jefferson - Bass
Daniel Frazier - Drums

Production
Gary Cioffi - Producer
Steven Haigler - Mix/Master

References

2014 albums
Transit (band) albums
Rise Records albums